In probability theory, Kolmogorov's two-series theorem is a result about the convergence of random series. It follows from Kolmogorov's inequality and is used in one proof of the strong law of large numbers.

Statement of the theorem 

Let  be independent random variables with expected values  and variances , such that  converges in ℝ and  converges in ℝ. Then  converges in ℝ almost surely.

Proof 

Assume WLOG . Set , and we will see that  with probability 1.

For every ,

While the second inequality is due to Kolmogorov's inequality.

By the assumption that  converges, it follows that the last term tends to 0 when , for every arbitrary .

References

 Durrett, Rick. Probability: Theory and Examples. Duxbury advanced series, Third Edition, Thomson Brooks/Cole, 2005, Section 1.8, pp. 60–69.
 M. Loève, Probability theory, Princeton Univ. Press (1963) pp. Sect. 16.3
 W. Feller, An introduction to probability theory and its applications, 2, Wiley (1971) pp. Sect. IX.9

Probability theorems